Elections to the Nagaland Legislative Assembly were held in February 2008 to elect members of the 60 constituencies in Nagaland, India. The Indian National Congress won the most votes, while the Nagaland Peoples Front won the most seats and Neiphiu Rio was appointed as the Chief Minister of Nagaland. The number of constituencies was set as 60 by the recommendation of the Delimitation Commission of India.

Result

Elected members

See also
List of constituencies of the Nagaland Legislative Assembly
2008 elections in India

References

2008 in Nagaland
Nagaland
State Assembly elections in Nagaland
2008